The Seascape Beach Resort is a resort located in Aptos, California in the United States.

History

Seascape Beach Resort was founded and built by Aptos Seascape Corporation in the 1960s. The resort is located on 45 acres of the privately owned Seascape Beach, which lies between Capitola and the Pajaro River. The resort is adjacent to Seascape Park. It overlooks the Monterey Bay. It is the largest privately owned single development project in Aptos. While founded in the 1960s, it wasn't until the 1990s that the first condominiums were built. All of the Condos within the development are individually owned and are zoned visitor accommodations.  Owners can choose either resort management or self manage via VRBO, Airbnb, etc,.  The hotel has been visited by Pablo Sandoval, Justin Bieber and Selena Gomez.

Facilities

There are 285 rooms onsite spread over seven buildings. The decor is described as "beach house" style "painted with muted pastels, neutral tones, and panoramic views." The resort has one restaurant, Sanderlings Restaurant. There is an onsite spa, called the Sanctuary Spa, 11 tennis courts, beach access, and an 18-hole golf course.

References

Seaside resorts in California
Aptos, California
Buildings and structures in Santa Cruz County, California
Timeshare